Caroline Lundberg (born 28 March 1990) is a Swedish footballer forward who played for Kvarnsvedens IK starting in 2016.

References 

1990 births
Living people
Swedish women's footballers
IK Sirius Fotboll players
Djurgårdens IF Fotboll (women) players
Damallsvenskan players
Expatriate women's footballers in Sweden
Women's association football forwards
Kvarnsvedens IK players